The Lithuania men's national under-18 and under-19 basketball team (Lithuanian: Lietuvos nacionalinė vaikinų jaunių iki 18 ir jaunimo iki 19 krepšinio rinktinė), is the representative for Lithuania in international basketball competitions, and it is organized and run by the Lithuanian Basketball Federation. The Lithuania men's national under-18 basketball team represents Lithuania at the FIBA U18 European Championship, where they have a chance to qualify for the FIBA U19 World Cup.

Competitive record

FIBA U18 European Championship

FIBA U19 World Cup

Current roster
2019 FIBA Under-19 Basketball World Cup

References

External links
 Lithuanian Basketball Federation (LKF)

M U18 and U19
Men's national under-18 basketball teams
Men's national under-19 basketball teams